Paul-François Huart-Chapel (1770–1850), was a Belgian industrialist, and politician.

He was born in Charleroi. He married Mary Chapel, the daughter of an industrialist.

In 1806 he inherited the factories of the Chapel family. He introduced a reverbatory furnace for melting metal in 1807, in 1821 the first Puddling furnace in Belgium (with J.M. Orban).

Shortly after John Cockerill had built the first blast furnace in Belgium in Liege, he built a coke fired blast furnace in 1827 in Charleroi, 12m high and producing 6 to 10tonnes of pig iron a day.

Between 1831 and 1834 he was Mayor of Charleroi. He died aged 80.

References

Politicians from Charleroi
Belgian industrialists
Mayors of places in Belgium
1770 births
1850 deaths